General José Francisco Zelaya y Ayes (1798 – 1848) was acting President of Honduras from 21 September 1839 to 1 January 1841.

Sources
http://www.worldstatesmen.org/Honduras.htm

1798 births
1848 deaths
Presidents of Honduras
Honduran people of Basque descent
19th-century Honduran people
People from Olancho Department